Sar Tangan (also Romanized as Sar Tangān and Sar-i-Tangān) is a village in Baqeran Rural District, in the Central District of Birjand County, South Khorasan Province, Iran. At the 2006 census, its population was 14, in 6 families.

References 

Populated places in Birjand County